

Broadcast networks

Television
WSB-TV and syndicated: 1966–72
WTCG and syndicated: 1973–76
WTCG/WTBS/TBS: 1977–2007 
Bally Sports South (formerly SportSouth): 1991–present 
Bally Sports Southeast (formerly Turner South and SportSouth): 2000–present
WPCH-TV (Peachtree TV; formerly WTBS): 2008–12
Comcast/Charter Sports Southeast aired Peachtree TV broadcasts outside Atlanta DMA: 2008–10
FSN South aired Peachtree TV broadcasts outside Atlanta DMA: 2011–12

Radio
Braves Radio Network: 1925–present
WSB (AM): 1966–1991, 1995–2004
WGST: 1992–1994, 2005–2009
WNNX (FM): 2010–2013, 2019–present
WCNN: 2010–present 
WYAY (FM) : 2014–2019

Broadcasters by name

Current announcers

Brandon Gaudin: (play-by-play, 2023–present) Bally Sports South and Southeast
Paul Byrd: (analyst/reporter, 2014–present) Bally Sports South and Southeast
Kelly Crull: (reporter, 2020–present) Bally Sports South and Southeast
Jeff Francoeur: (analyst, 2017–present) Bally Sports South and Southeast
Tom Glavine: (guest analyst, 2010–present ) Bally Sports South and Southeast
Ben Ingram: (host, 2011–2019; play-by-play, 2019–present) Braves Radio Network
Brian Jordan: (guest analyst, 2011–2012; analyst 2022–present) Bally Sports South and Southeast
Pete Manzano: (play-by-play, 1992–present) Atlanta Braves International Radio Network and TBS SAP
Peter Moylan: (analyst, 2019–present) Bally Sports South and Southeast
Fernando Palacios: (analyst, 2003–present) TBS SAP
Jim Powell: (play-by-play, 2009–present) Braves Radio Network
Joe Simpson: (analyst, 1992–present) Braves Radio Network

Former announcers
Hank Aaron: (analyst, 1980) TBS and Braves Radio Network (deceased)
Mel Allen: (play-by-play, 1965) Braves Radio Network (deceased)
Tim Brando: (play-by-play, 1995–1997) SportSouth
Jim Britt: (play-by-play, 1940–1952) Braves Radio Network, WBZ-TV (deceased)
Brett Butler: (analyst, 2000) FSN South
Chip Caray: (play-by-play, 1991–1992, 2005–2022) Fox Sports South and Fox Sports Southeast
Skip Caray: (play-by-play, 1976–2008) TBS, Turner South and Braves Radio Network (deceased)
Darrell Chaney: (analyst, 1981–1982) TBS and Braves Radio Network
Dave Cohen: (in-game reporter, 1997) FSN South
Dizzy Dean: (play-by-play, color commentator, 1966–68) Braves TV (WSB-TV) (deceased)
Charlie Donelan: (play-by-play, 1925) Braves Radio Network (deceased)
Al Downing: (analyst, 2000) FSN South
Leo Egan: (play-by-play, 1949–1950) Braves Radio Network (deceased)
Frank Fallon (play-by-play, 1946) Braves Radio Network (deceased)
Frankie Frisch: (analyst, 1939) Braves Radio Network (deceased)
Ron Gant: (analyst, 2004–2006) TBS, Turner South; (analyst, 2011–2012) Peachtree TV
Earl Gillespie: (play-by-play, 1953–1963) Braves Radio Network (deceased)
Bump Hadley: (play-by-play, 1949–1952) Braves Radio Network, WBZ-TV (deceased)
Milo Hamilton: (play-by-play, 1966–1975) Braves Radio Network (deceased)
Merle Harmon: (play-by-play, 1964–1965) Braves Radio Network (deceased)
George Hartrick: (play-by-play, 1943–1945) Braves Radio Network (deceased)
Fred Hoey: (play-by-play, 1926–1938) Braves Radio Network (deceased)
Tom Hussey: (play-by-play, 1939–1950) Braves Radio Network, WBZ-TV (deceased)
Ernie Johnson Sr.: (play-by-play, 1962–1999) Braves Radio Network, TBS, SportSouth and FSN South (deceased) 
Ernie Johnson Jr.: (play-by-play, 1993–1996, 2010) SportSouth and Peachtree TV
Bob Kelly: (play-by-play, 1953) Braves Radio Network (deceased)
Mark Lemke: (analyst, 2007–2019) Braves Radio Network
Bill Mazer: (play-by-play, 1964) Braves Radio Network
Larry Munson: (play-by-play, 1966–1967) Braves Radio Network (deceased)
Dale Murphy: (guest analyst, 2012) Fox Sports South and Fox Sports Southeast
Dave O'Brien: (play-by-play, 1990–1991) TBS and Braves Radio Network
Tom Paciorek: (analyst, 2001–2005) FSN South
Bob Rathbun: (play-by-play, 1997–2006) FSN South and Turner South
Billy Sample: (analyst, 1988–1989) TBS and Braves Radio Network
Chris Schenkel: (play-by-play, 1954) Braves Radio Network (deceased)
Jon Sciambi: (play-by-play, 2007–2009) FSN South and SportSouth
Les Smith (play-by-play, color commentator, 1948–1952) Braves Radio Network, WNAC-TV
John Smoltz: (analyst, color commentator, 2008, 2010, 2014) Peachtree TV (2008, 2010), FSN South, and SportSouth (2014)
John Sterling: (play-by-play, 1982–1987) TBS and Braves Radio Network
Don Sutton: (play-by-play, and analyst 1989–2006, 2009–2018) Braves Radio Network (deceased)
Jeff Torborg: (analyst, 2006) FSN South and Turner South
Pete Van Wieren: (play-by-play, 1976–2008) Braves Radio Network, TBS, and Turner South (deceased)
Blaine Walsh: (play-by-play, 1954–1965) Braves Radio Network (deceased)

Studio hosts

Current
Gordon Beckham: (TV analyst, 2022–present) Fox Sports South and Fox Sports Southeast
Paul Byrd: (TV analyst/reporter, 2014–present) Fox Sports South and Fox Sports Southeast
Kelly Crull: (fill-in TV host, 2020–present) Fox Sports South and Fox Sports Southeast
Jeff Francoeur: (TV analyst, 2017–present) Fox Sports South and Fox Sports Southeast
Nick Green: (TV analyst, 2015–present) Fox Sports South and Fox Sports Southeast
Ben Ingram: (radio host, 2011–present) Braves Radio Network
Brian Jordan: (TV analyst, 2011–present) Fox Sports South and Fox Sports Southeast
Kevin McAlpin: (radio host, 2012–present) Braves Radio Network
Peter Moylan: (TV analyst, 2019–present) Fox Sports South and Fox Sports Southeast
Treavor Scales: (TV host, 2022–present) Fox Sports South and Fox Sports Southeast

Former
Erin Andrews: (host, 2002–2003) TBS
Chip Caray: (radio host, 2007–2010) Braves Radio Network
Dave Cohen: Host Braves Report Fox Sports South 1997; Braves Radio Network 1998-2001
Mitch Evans: (radio host, 2007–2010) Braves Radio Network
Marc Fein: (host, 2005–2007) TBS
Bob Fiscella: (host, 2005–2006) FSN South
Matt Diaz: (TV analyst, 2014–2015) FSN South and SportSouth
Stu Klitenic: (host, 2005–2006) Braves Radio Network
Jerome Jurenovich: (TV host, 2007–2021) Fox Sports South and Fox Sports Southeast and Fox Sports Tennessee (as Preds Studios Update Around the NHL Game)
Bill Shanks: (analyst, 2006) Braves Radio Network
Daron Sutton: (host of The Dodge Braves Report, 1998–1999 on Fox Sports South, a half-hour pre-game show.)
 Kelsey Wingert: (Reporter/host, 2016–2020) Fox Sports South and Fox Sports Southeast

See also
Braves TBS Baseball
List of current Major League Baseball broadcasters

References

 
Atlanta Braves
Fox Sports Networks
Prime Sports
Bally Sports
Atlanta Braves broadcasters
Broadcasters